Burin-Grand Bank is a provincial electoral district in Newfoundland and Labrador represented by a member in the Newfoundland and Labrador House of Assembly. It was contested for the first time in the 2015 provincial election. The district was created out of all of Grand Bank and parts of Burin-Placentia West and Bellevue.

The district contains a ferry serving St. Pierre and Miquelon, which is part of France, via a port in Fortune. The district also contains an intra-provincial ferry serving Rencontre East via Bay L'Argent.

Members of the House of Assembly
The district has elected the following Members of the House of Assembly:

Election results

References

Newfoundland and Labrador provincial electoral districts